Colorado is a neighbourhood located within the Mitchells Plain urban area of the City of Cape Town in the Western Cape province of South Africa. It is located in the north western part of the Mitchells Plain area.

References 

Suburbs of Cape Town